Yasumura (written: 保村 or 安村) is a Japanese surname. Notable people with the surname include:

, Japanese voice actor
, Japanese comedian

Japanese-language surnames